Turkey participates at the Summer Universiade.

Medal count
As of July 2019, Turkey has won 124 medals in 22 appearances at the Summer Universiade and one silver in winter.

See also 
Turkey at the Olympics
Turkey at the Paralympics
Turkey at the Mediterranean Games

References

External links
 FISU History at the FISU

 
Nations at the Universiade
Student sport in Turkey